The Elm City Rivalry is an American college football rivalry between the New Haven Chargers of the University of New Haven and Southern Connecticut Owls of Southern Connecticut State University.

History
In 2004 New Haven dropped its football programs which was playing as a division II independent. In 2007 New Haven was accepted into the Northeast-10 Conference as a full member, joining rival Southern Connecticut. New Haven was able to restart its football program starting with the 2009 season.

Game results

See also
List of NCAA college football rivalry games

References

College football rivalries in the United States
New Haven Chargers football
Southern Connecticut State Owls football
1981 establishments in Connecticut